Johnnie Tolan (October 22, 1917 – June 6, 1986 in Redondo Beach, California) was an American racecar driver.

Racing career
Tolan won 45 midget car races in 1946, and won the Rocky Mountain Midget Racing Association championship. Tolan repeated his championship in 1947, and scored 47 wins. He had 27 feature wins in 1948.

He captured the 1950 AAA Midwest championship. He captured his first National Midget championship in 1952, as well as the Midwest championship. He won the 1953 Night Before the 500 midget car race.

He competed at the Indianapolis 500 in 1956, 1957, and 1958. His best finish was thirteenth in 1958.

Tolan traveled with Bob Tattersall and Jimmy Davies to Australia in 1964. Tolan suffered career ending back injuries at the Sydney Showgrounds.

Tolan had a ritual at each midget racing event. He would smoke a cigarette during warmups. He would flip the cigarette toward the starting line on his first high speed lap. He believed that he would have a successful night if he hit the mark.

Career award
He was inducted in the National Midget Auto Racing Hall of Fame in 1988.

Indy 500 results

World Championship career summary
The Indianapolis 500 was part of the FIA World Championship from 1950 through 1960. Drivers competing at Indy during those years were credited with World Championship points and participation. Johnnie Tolan participated in 3 World Championship races but scored no World Championship points.

References

1917 births
1986 deaths
Indianapolis 500 drivers
American racing drivers